Evangelismos is a small neighborhood of Athens, Greece, named after Evangelismos Hospital. It is located within Kolonaki.

The area is served by the a metro station of the same name on Line 3 of the Athens metro.

Neighbourhoods in Athens

el:Ευαγγελισμός (συνοικία)
fi:Evangelismós